Bassetlaw may refer to:

 Bassetlaw (UK Parliament constituency), Nottinghamshire constituency in the British House of Commons
 Bassetlaw District General Hospital, a National Health Service hospital in Worksop, Nottinghamshire
 Bassetlaw District, a local government district in the county of Nottinghamshire, England
 Bassetlaw Museum, Retford
 Bassetlaw Wapentake
 Stagecoach in Bassetlaw, Stagecoach East Midlands operations in the Bassetlaw district

See also 
 Bassetlaw by-election (disambiguation)